Ecorchement may refer to:
French
 skinning 
 flaying
Other
 A paraphilia defined as sexual arousal by flagellation